 
Bulge may refer to:

Astronomy and geography
Bulge (astronomy), a tightly packed group of stars at the center of a spiral galaxy
Equatorial bulge, a bulge around the equator of a planet due to rotation
Tharsis bulge, vast volcanic plateau centered near the equator in Mars’ western hemisphere
Tidal bulge, a bulge of land or water on a planet created by the pull of another object in orbit

Military
Bulge, a discontinuity in an extended military front line
Battle of the Bulge, a major World War II German offensive on the Western front starting in 1944
Bulge (game), a 1980 board wargame that simulates the Battle of the Bulge
Anti-torpedo bulge, passive warship defence against naval torpedoes between World War I and World War II

People
Helge "Bulge" Bostrom (1894–1977), Canadian professional ice hockey player

Other
Beta bulge, a localized disruption of the regular hydrogen bonding of a beta sheet
Bulge bracket, the world's largest and most profitable multi-national investment banks
Earth bulge, a term used in telecommunications
Power bulge, raised part (a bulge) of the hood (bonnet) of a car
The Bulge, a mountain located in Coos County, New Hampshire

See also
Battle of the Bulge (disambiguation)
Crotch, in men sometimes referred to as a bulge
Forebulge
Hernia, sometimes referred to as a bulge or bulge out
South Sister Bulge the oldest and most eroded of the Three Sisters (Oregon), known as "Faith"